Ashburton is a town in Msunduzi Local Municipality in the KwaZulu-Natal province of South Africa. It is situated next to the N3 about 12 km east of Pietermaritzburg.

References

Populated places in the Msunduzi Local Municipality